WTNV (97.3 FM, "Eagle 97.3") is a radio station broadcasting a country music format. Licensed to Tiptonville, Tennessee, United States, and based in Dyersburg, Tennessee, the station is currently owned by Burks Broadcasting, through licensee Dr. Pepper Pepsi-Cola Bottling Company of Dyersburg, LLC (dba Burks Beverage).

References

External links
 
 

Country radio stations in the United States
TNV
Lake County, Tennessee